Osmeña pearls are items of jewelry made by polishing the shell of a nautilus. It has an iridescent color typically consisting of blue, pink, and purple hues.

Nautiluses
Pearls